Rodolfo Campo Soto (born August 15, 1942) is a Colombian politician and Mechanical engineer from the Pontifical Bolivarian University. Campo Soto became the first elected Mayor of Valledupar in 1992, and was reelected again for a second term in 1998.

References

1942 births
Colombian mechanical engineers
Mayors of places in Colombia
People from Valledupar
Living people
Colombian Conservative Party politicians